Matiari District is a district in the Pakistani province of Sindh. Located on the left bank of the Indus River, Matiari became an independent district in 2004 under the military regime of Pervez Musharraf, when Hyderabad was divided into four districts — Tando Allahyar, Matiari, Tando Mohammad Khan and Hyderabad.

Etymology

Matiari word is derived from two Sindhi words Mat and yari, which means friendship with earthen water pots.

According to culture, the Main Bus Stop at Matiari Main Road was where a Lady sat in a hut a long time ago. It is where she keeps a mud pot of water. People of Matiari tell the bus conductor "Mat Wari Maai" (Make Stop at Old Women's Hut Where She Keeps Mud Pot of Water). This is apparently why it the district is called Matiari.

History and administration
Matiari district was carved out of Hyderabad district along with Tando Allahyar and Tando Muhammad Khan districts in 2005. Matiari district is part of  the Hyderabad division. The district is administratively subdivided into three talukas:

 Hala
 Matiari
 Saeedabad

There are 30 union councils in the district as tabulated below:

Demography
At the time of the 2017 census, Matiari district had a population of 770,040, of which 396,922 were males and 373,041 females. The rural population was 587,371 (76.28%) and urban 182,669 (23.72%). The literacy rate is 42.63%: 54.05% for males and 38.48% for females.

The majority religion is Islam, with 83.28% of the population. Hinduism (including those from Scheduled Castes) is 16.66% of the population.

At the time of the 2017 census, 92.50% of the population spoke Sindhi, 2.68% Urdu, 1.10% Punjabi and 1.04% Balochi as their first language.

Notable places

The shrines of Pir Rukun-Din-Shah, Makhdoom Sarwar Nooh, Shah Abdul Latif Bhittai, Sakhi Hashim Shah pir Haider shah, Muhammad Faquir Khatian and others are located in Matiari district. Miani forest and the battleground of Sir Charles Napier and Talpur rulers of Sindh and Miani jo Maidan are also situated in Matiari district.

Syed Rukun-Din-Shah also fought a battle with the Arguns dynasty with seven bilalis of sindh.

At Khuda aabad, one can find the graves and the tombs of Mughal Empires era. There is a Masjid (Praying Place) and a well of water.

The Indus River is also there.

Agriculture

Matiari district is one of the most fertile districts of Sindh. The main crops cultivated are cotton, banana, mango, wheat, onions and sugarcane.

Politics

The elected representatives from Matiari district are   
 MNA Makhdoom Jameel-uz-Zaman (PPPP) NA 223
 MPA Makhdoom Mehboob Zaman (PPPP) PS 58
 MPA Makhdoom Rafique Zaman (PPPP) PS 59

List of union councils
The following is a list of Matiari District's union councils, organised by Tehsils:

 Hala Tehsil (35 Dehs)
 Bhanbhri
 Bhanoth
 Bhit Shah
 Bundh
 Bunglow
 Bureri
 Char
 Dhabri
 Gahoth
 Gaib peer
 Ghoghat
 Ghotana
 Hala
 Hala old
 Jamlabad
 Jhirki
 Kalri
 Katcho Khanoth
 Keeriya
 Khandu
 Khanoth
 Kutkai
 Lakhisar
 Narli
 Nizamani
 Nooralabad
 Noorketi
 Pir Bilawal
 Rechal
 Rojhani
 Salaro
 Sandhan
 Shaikhani
 Tarah
 Verato
 Matiari Tehsil (49 Dehs)
 Abrejani
 Arain
 Barechani
 Baudero
 Bhanoki
 Bhorko
 Buhryoon
 Chharao
 Dhando
 Ganag Rayati
 Gang Jagir
 Hakra
 Jaheki
 Kaindal Kot
 Jakhri Jagir
 Jakhri Joya
 Jakhri Rayati
 Ketti
 Khorkhani
 Khudi
 Khyberani
 Koheki
 Lutryoon
 Mari
 Matiari
 Mubarak Wah
 Nindero
 Oderolal
 Palijani
 Panhwarki
 Pano
 Porath
 Reechal
 Sadri
 Saeedpur
 Sahib Saman
 Sattar
 Sekhat
 Shahpur
 Sipki Jagir
 Sipki Rayati
 Sohiki
 Soomra
 Sultanpur
 Tajpur
 Thano
 Thorha
 Vesro
 Wassan
 Saeedabad Tehsil (28 Dehs)
 Ahano
 Amin Lakho
 Bawri
 Chhachhri
 Chhapar Kahan
 Chitori
 Dalo Keti
 Dethki
 Fatehpur
 Gadali
 Giss
 Jamali
 Kaka
 Khatoori
 Khuteero
 Koonar
 Larh
 Manahi
 Odiyanoo
 Panjmoro
 Peengharo Jagir
 Peengharo Raieti
 Rahoo
 Rahooki
 Ranoo
 Saeedabad
 Suhrabpur
 Zairpir

Notes

References

Bibliography

External links

 
Districts of Sindh